The Communist Party of Nepal (Unified Marxist–Leninist) (abbr. CPN (UML)) is a communist political party in Nepal. The party emerged as a major party in Nepal after the end of the Panchayat era.

Khadga Prasad Oli has served as party chairman since the party's ninth general convention in 2014. The party currently holds 78 seats in the House of Representatives, having won 26.95% of the party list votes in the 2022 general election and is the second largest parliamentary group. The party is the major coalition partner in the current CPN (Maoist Centre) led coalition government. There have been four prime ministers from the party while the party has led the government five times.

CPN (UML) was the main opposition after the first election following the restoration of multi-party democracy. The party led a minority government under Manmohan Adhikari following the 1994 election. The party joined a coalition government with CPN (Maoist) in 2008 in the first elections after the end of the monarchy in Nepal and led two governments under Madhav Kumar Nepal and Jhala Nath Khanal during the term of the 1st Constituent Assembly. The party also led the first government after the promulgation of the new constitution with KP Sharma Oli serving as prime minister. Oli again served as prime minister following the 2017 election.

The party was formed in January 1991 after the merger of the Communist Party of Nepal (Marxist) and the Communist Party of Nepal (Marxist–Leninist). The party merged with CPN (Maoist Centre) to form the Nepal Communist Party on 17 May 2018 but the new party was dissolved and CPN (UML) was revived by a Supreme Court decision on 8 March 2021. The party claimed to have 855,000 members as of December 2021 making them the largest party in Nepal by membership.

History

Origins and early years, 1991–1993 
The United Left Front was formed in 1990 to protest the Panchayat system and restore multi-party democracy. They organized a joint movement with the Nepali Congress, and King Birendra yielded to their Jana Andolan in November 1990. Two constituents of the United Left Front, CPN (Marxist) and CPN (Marxist–Leninist), merged on 6 January 1991 to form the Communist Party of Nepal (Unified Marxist–Leninist) before the 1991 elections, and the United Left Front became inactive.

In the 1991 elections, the party won 69 of 205 seats and was the second-largest party in the House of Representatives. Man Mohan Adhikari was elected head of the parliamentary group, and became the Leader of the Opposition in May 1991. On 28 June 1991, CPN (Burma) which had reconstituted itself after breaking away from CPN (United) merged into the party. The fifth party congress was held in Kathmandu in January 1993, and People's Multiparty Democracy was adopted as its main ideology. The same ideology of People's Multiparty Democracy theorized by Madhan Bhandari made it one of the most prominent political parties in years to come. In the fifth party congress, Adhikari was elected chairman, and Madan Bhandari was elected general secretary. Bhandari was killed in a vehicle accident in Chitwan later that year, and Madhav Kumar Nepal became the party's general secretary. In November 1993, CPN (Amatya) led by Tulsi Lal Amatya, which had also broken off from CPN (United), merged into the party.

First government and split, 1994–1997 
After the mid-term elections in 1994, the party won 88 of 205 seats in a hung parliament and formed a minority government under Man Mohan Adhikari. The government lasted for nine months after Adhikari was forced to resign when he lost a no-confidence motion in September 1995. The party was back in the government in March 1997, after supporting the Lokendra Bahadur Chand-led Rastriya Prajatantra Party government. Following dissension in the RPP, Lokendra Bahadur Chand resigned and CPN (UML) returned to the opposition.

The party faced its first split in March 1998, after disagreements about a water-sharing agreement with India. The new party formed with 46 legislators from the mother party as the Communist Party of Nepal (Marxist–Leninist), under the leadership of Bam Dev Gautam. The party joined the government again in December 1998, backing the Girija Prasad Koirala-led Nepali Congress–Nepal Sadbhawana Party coalition government. In the 1999 elections, the party won 70 of 205 seats and was the second-largest party in the House of Representatives.

Reunification and direct rule, 2002–2006 
Most members of the Communist Party of Nepal (Marxist–Leninist) rejoined the parent party on 15 February 2002, while other members led by Chandra Prakash Mainali decided to restructure the party. The party's seventh general convention was held in Janakpur on February 1–6, 2003. The convention decided to abolish the post of party chair, vacant after the death of Man Mohan Adhikari and Madhav Kumar Nepal was unanimously reelected as general secretary of the party.

When King Gyanendra dissolved Parliament and sacked Prime Minister Sher Bahadur Deuba of Nepali Congress in 2003, five other parties protested his decision. However, when Deuba was reinstated CPN (UML) joined the provisional government with Bharat Mohan Adhikari as deputy prime minister. This government was dissolved by the king on 1 February 2005 and Seven Party Alliance was formed to protest his decision. Following an agreement with the Communist Party of Nepal (Maoist), a joint struggle was launched against the king's direct rule. On 10 April 2006, the parliament was reconvened by the king and a government was formed under Congress leader Girija Prasad Koirala.

1st Constituent Assembly, 2008–2012 

In the 2008 Constituent Assembly elections, the party won 108 of 605 seats and finished third. Madhav Kumar Nepal resigned as general secretary, and was replaced by Jhala Nath Khanal. The party backed Communist Party of Nepal (Maoist) candidate Pushpa Kamal Dahal, and joined his government in August 2008. Khanal was elected party chairman and Ishwor Pokhrel general secretary by the eighth general convention in Butwal in February 2009.

In early May 2009, the CPN (UML) joined several other parties in leaving Dahal's coalition government after he sacked Army Chief of Staff Rookmangud Katawal. Following their withdrawal, they formed a new coalition government with the Nepali Congress and the Madhesi Jana Adhikar Forum under Madhav Kumar Nepal. Nepal resigned in June 2010 after failing to draft a new constitution. Following more than seven months of political stalemate, Khanal was elected prime minister in February 2011 with support from the UCPN (Maoist). He resigned in August after he failed to reach a consensus with the other parties on drafting a new constitution and the peace process. The party joined the next government, led by Baburam Bhattarai, on 28 August 2011. On November 2012, Ashok Kumar Rai broke away from the party along with other indigenous leaders and formed the Federal Socialist Party claiming that the party failed to address their concerns during the discussions for promulgation of the constitution.

2nd Constituent Assembly, 2013–2017 
Following Bhattarai's dissolution of the 1st Constituent Assembly after its failure to draft a new constitution before the deadline, the CPN (UML) became the second-largest party after winning 175 of 575 elected seats in the 2013 elections. The party joined a coalition government under Sushil Koirala with the ruling Nepali Congress and the Rastriya Prajatantra Party. In July 2014, Khadga Prasad Oli became party chair after he defeated Madhav Kumar Nepal in the party's ninth general convention.

The new constitution was delivered by the coalition government government on 20 September 2015. After the new constitution was drafted, Sushil Koirala resigned and party chairman Khadga Prasad Oli was elected prime minister with support from the UCPN (Maoist), the Rastriya Prajatantra Party Nepal and other parties. Oli resigned in July 2016 before a motion of no confidence supported by the Nepali Congress and the Communist Party of Nepal (Maoist Centre).

In the 2017 local elections, 14,099 councilors, including 294 municipal mayors and rural chairs, were elected from the party to local governments. Candidates for the party were elected as mayors in major cities, including the two largest cities Kathmandu and Pokhara Lekhnath.

1st Federal Parliament, 2017–2022

Left alliance and dissolution, 2017–2018 

The party announced an alliance with the CPN (Maoist Centre) before the 2017 legislative and provincial elections. The party won 121 seats, becoming the largest party in the House of Representatives, and became the largest party in six of Nepal's seven provinces. After the election, the party maintained its alliance with the CPN (Maoist Centre) and formed coalition governments in Nepal's centre and six of the seven provinces. According to the power-sharing agreement, the CPN (UML) would lead governments in Province 1, Province 3, Province 4 and Province 5. In accordance with the agreement Sher Dhan Rai, Dormani Paudel, Prithivi Subba Gurung and Shankar Pokharel were appointed as chief ministers of their respective provinces.

In the 6 February 2018 National Assembly election, the CPN (UML) won 27 of 56 contested seats and again became the country's largest party. Party chairman Oli was elected the party's parliamentary leader in the House of Representatives and appointed prime minister on February 15. Bidya Devi Bhandari was re-elected president on March 13. After eight months of planning, the Unification Coordination Committee met to finalize plans for the merger of Nepal's biggest left-wing parties. On 17 May 2018, the party was dissolved and a new party, the Nepal Communist Party was formed from the CPN (UML) and the CPN (Maoist Centre).

Revival and internal conflict, 2021 

On 8 March 2021, the Supreme Court of Nepal stated that the allocation of the name Nepal Communist Party upon the merger of the CPN (UML) and CPN (Maoist Centre), and by extension the merger itself, was void ab initio, as the name was already allotted to a party led by Rishiram Kattel, and that the NCP stood "dismissed". The Election Commission on 9 March 2021 formally split the party and the CPN (UML) was revived. Four members of the House of Representatives and one member of the National Assembly for CPN (Maoist Centre) also defected to CPN (UML) during the split but were dismissed as parliamentarians following their defection.

KP Sharma Oli lost a no-confidence motion on 9 May 2021 but was reappointed as prime minister four days later after the opposition failed to prove a majority. Chief minister of Gandaki, Prithvi Subba Gurung resigned before a no-confidence motion and chief Minister of Lumbini, Shankar Pokharel also lost a no-confidence motion but were similarly reappointed after the opposition failed to prove their majority.

A cabinet meeting chaired by prime minister and party chairman KP Sharma Oli recommended the president to dissolve the House of Representatives on 22 May 2021 after members of his party led by former prime ministers Madhav Kumar Nepal and Jhala Nath Khanal supported Nepali Congress leader Sher Bahadur Deuba as the next prime minister. The Supreme Court reinstated the House of Representatives on 12 July 2021 and Oli resigned from his post the next day and Deuba was appointed prime minister. Twenty-two members of the CPN (UML) voted for Deuba during his confidence vote defying the party whip.

The party also lost its government in Gandaki and Lumbini with Gurung losing a no-confidence motion and Pokharel resigning. Province 1 chief minister, Sher Dhan Rai and Bagmati chief minister Dormani Paudel were replaced in August of that year after losing support within their parliamentary party. They were replaced by Bhim Acharya and Asta Laxmi Shakya respectively who were elected by the parliamentary party.

Opposition and splits, 2021–2022 

On 25 August 2021, former prime ministers Madhav Kumar Nepal and Jhala Nath Khanal split from the party along with 55 members of the Central Committee, 25 members of the House of Representatives and seven members of the National Assembly and formed the CPN (Unified Socialist). Following the split, the party lost its majority in Bagmati and Province 1 and Shakya and Acharya resigned following which the party was in opposition in all seven provinces.

The 10th National Convention of the party was held in Chitwan between 26 and 29 November 2021. The convention reelected KP Sharma Oli as the party chair. Hridayesh Tripathi who had been elected to the House of Representatives from the CPN (UML) formed a separate party, the People's Progressive Party in December 2021. Bamdev Gautam who served as the senior vice-chairman left the party in September 2021 and in June 2022 announced the formation of CPN (Unity National Campaign).

In the 2022 local elections, 11,929 councillors were elected from the party including 206 mayors and rural chairs. The party lost their mayoral seats in Kathmandu and Pokhara and failed to win the mayoral elections in any of the six metropolitan cities in the country.

2nd Federal Parliament (2022–present) 
The party formed electoral pacts with People's Socialist Party, Rastriya Prajatantra Party and other minor parties to contest the 2022 general and provincial elections. Former deputy prime minister and Rastriya Prajatantra Party Nepal chair Kamal Thapa also contested the election under the party's electoral symbol. Influential leaders and incumbent members of parliament including Bhim Rawal, Ghanashyam Bhusal and Ram Bir Manandhar were denied tickets from the party. Bhusal and Manandhar later filed their candidacy as independents. Leaders associated with former MP Prabhu Sah who had joined the party from CPN (Maoist Centre) in 2021 also decided to contest the election as independents following dissatisfaction with the electoral pact with People's Socialist Party in Madhesh. The three leaders were later supported by the Democratic Left Alliance during the elections.

The party won in 44 constituencies at the 2022 general election. The party got the most votes through proportional voting and won an additional 34 seats for a total of 78 seats to the House of Representatives making them the second largest parliamentary party. The party also emerged as the largest party in provincial assemblies in Province 1, Madhesh and Lumbini at the 2022 provincial elections. 

The party backed CPN (Maoist Centre) chairman Pushpa Kamal Dahal's bid to become prime minister and joined a coalition government under him on 26 December 2022. Bishnu Prasad Paudel joined the cabinet as deputy prime minister and Minister of Finance along with three other CPN (UML) MPs.

Ideology 

The guiding principle of the party is Marxism–Leninism and it supports a socialism oriented economy but within the confines of a parliamentary system of governance. The party had adopted the line of People's Multiparty Democracy which was proposed by Madan Bhandari at the party's 5th National Convention in 1993. The party supports the establishment of a welfare system that guarantees social security and social justice to all citizens.

Symbol 
The election symbol of CPN (UML) is the sun which is also present in the party logo. The hammer and sickle, a common symbol of communism, is also used in the party flag and logo. The party constitution determines that a golden hammer and sickle inside a red sun is the party's logo.

Organisation

Central organisation 
The National Convention is the supreme body of CPN (UML) and it is organized every five years by the party's Central Committee. The national convention elects the central secretariat and the central committee of the party. The convention also discusses and approves political documents, organisational proposals and amendments to the party constitution.

The Central Committee of the party is the highest decision making body within general conventions and is responsible to the national convention. The National Convention elects a Central Secretariat consisting of a chair, a senior vice-chair, six vice-chairs, one general secretary, three deputy general secretaries and seven secretaries. The Central Secretariat along with other elected members make up the 301-member Central Committee of the party. The chairs of the seven provincial committees of the party are also ex-officio members of the Central Committee. One-third of the committee is also required to be female. The Central Committee also elects a 99-member Politburo and a 45-member Standing Committee among its members.

When the Central Committee is not in session the Politburo is the highest decision making body, the Standing Committee follows the Politburo in hierarchy and the Central Secretariat follows the Standing Committee. The National Convention also elects a Central Disciplinary Commission, a Central Accounts Commission and a Central Electoral Commission. A Central Advisory Council can also be formed by the Central Committee if needed.

Provincial and local organisation 
Party committees exist at the provincial, district, local, ward and neighborhood level. In addition to this the party has a separate special committee in the Kathmandu Valley which is in the same level as the provincial committees in the party. The provincial committee holds a provincial convention every four years and the rest of the committees hold a convention every three years except for neighborhood committees which hold a convention every two years. The convention elects the leadership and members of the committee which is the supreme decision making body in between conventions. The party also has organisational committees for areas where the party does not have presence yet.

Electoral performance

Legislative elections

Provincial Assembly elections

Province 1

Madhesh

Bagmati

Gandaki

Lumbini

Karnali

Sudurpaschim

Local election

Leadership

Chairmen 
 Man Mohan Adhikari, 1991–1999
 Jhala Nath Khanal, 2009–2014
 Khadga Prasad Oli, 2014–2018, 2021–present

General secretaries 
 Madan Bhandari, 1993
 Madhav Kumar Nepal, 1993–2008
 Jhala Nath Khanal, 2008–2009
 Ishwor Pokhrel, 2009–2018, in 2021
 Shankar Pokhrel, 2021–present

Prime Ministers of Nepal

Chief Ministers

Province 1

Bagmati Province

Gandaki Province

Lumbini Province

Sudurpashchim Province

Sister organizations 
 General Federation of Nepalese Trade Unions
 Youth Association of Nepal
 All Nepal National Free Students Union
 All Nepal Women's Association
 All Nepal Peasants Association
 All India Nepalese Free Students Union
 Nepal National Teachers Association
 National People's Cultural Forum
 Democratic National Organization of Persons with Disabilities–Nepal

See also 
 Communist Party of Nepal (Marxist–Leninist)
 Communist Party of Nepal (Marxist) (1986–91)
 Communist Party of Nepal (Marxist–Leninist) (1998) 
 Communist Party of Nepal (Unified Socialist)
 Nepal Communist Party 
 List of communist parties in Nepal

References

External links 

  (in English and Nepalese)
 Information on the party from FES

 
1991 establishments in Nepal
2018 disestablishments in Nepal
2021 establishments in Nepal
Communist parties in Nepal
Political parties disestablished in 2018
Political parties established in 1991
Political parties established in 2021
International Meeting of Communist and Workers Parties